is a Japanese short factual television programme broadcast daily by TV Asahi since June 1987. Produced by Telecom Staff and sponsored by Fujitsu, it follows railway journeys in various countries around the world, featuring people on board the trains and sights along the way.

Broadcast times
11:10 - 11:15 Monday to Friday

Countries covered

, 104 different countries have been featured, including the following:

 23 January 2012 - 1 April 2012: Hungary
 2 April 2012 - 10 June 2012: Switzerland
 11 June 2012 - 9 September 2012: Southern India
 10 September 2012 - 9 December 2012: France 
 10 December 2012 - 10 March 2013: Canada
 11 March 2013 - 31 May 2013: Vietnam
 3 June 2013 - 30 August 2013: Bangladesh
 2 September 2013 - 29 November 2013: Sweden and Norway
 2 December 2013 - 21 February 2014: Poland
 3 March 2014 - 9 May 2014: Indonesia
 12 May 2014 - 4 July 2014: Portugal
 7 July 2014 - 22 August 2014: Morocco
 25 August 2014 - 24 October 2014: Mongolia
 27 October 2014 - 23 January 2015: Northern Italy, France, and Corsica
 26 January 2015 - 3 April 2015: Australia
 6 April 2015 - 5 June 2015: Thailand
 8 June 2015 - 28 August 2015: Germany
 31 August 2015 - 20 November 2015: Czech Republic and Slovakia
 23 November 2015 - 5 February 2016: Finland
 8 February 2016 - 6 May 2016: Northern India
 9 May 2016 - 29 July 2016: Argentina and Uruguay

Staff
The programme is narrated by actor Kenjirō Ishimaru, and the opening and ending theme was composed by Hajime Mizoguchi.

Awards
See the World by Train received the First Memorial Award at the 2011 Festival Asia TV & Film on Journey event.

History
First broadcast in June 1987, the programme was aired for the 10,000th time on 2 May 2016, making it the second-longest running TV show still being broadcast in Japan, after Tetsuko's Room, also aired by TV Asahi.

References

External links
  (TV Asahi) 
  (Telecom Staff) 
 

TV Asahi original programming
1987 Japanese television series debuts
1980s Japanese television series
1990s Japanese television series
2000s Japanese television series
2010s Japanese television series